Betrayal is a 1929 American silent drama film produced for Famous Players-Lasky and released by Paramount Pictures.  The film is the last silent film directed by Lewis Milestone, the last silent performance by Gary Cooper, the last silent performance by Germany's Emil Jannings, and the only onscreen pairing of Cooper and Jannings.  It is considered a lost film.

Plot
Swiss peasant girl Vroni (Esther Ralston) is having a secret summer romance with Viennese artist Andre Frey (Gary Cooper).  When Andre later returns to Switzerland, he learns that Vroni has been forced to marry wealthy burgomeister Poldi Moser (Emil Jannings).  Explaining Andre's appearance, Vroni introduces him as a young man who has just lost his sweetheart, and in sympathy, Poldi invites Andre to be a guest in his house.

Several times over the next few years Andre visits, during which time Poldi and Vroni have two children. Andre is overwrought by his repressed feelings toward Vroni, and after seven years, begs her to run off with him. She refuses, but agrees to one last tryst.  While speeding down a dangerous run on a toboggan together, Vroni is killed and Andre fatally injured. Poldi learns the truth of the relationship while attending Vroni's funeral, and swears vengeance but discovers that Andre has died from the severity of his injuries.

Cast
 Emil Jannings as Poldi Moser 
 Esther Ralston as Vroni 
 Gary Cooper as Andre Frey 
 Douglas Haig as Peter 
 Jada Weller as Hans 
 Bodil Rosing as Andre's Mother  
 Ann Brody 
 Paul Guertzman
 Leone Lane

Production
Filmed at locations near Lake Tahoe, the film was intended to be a "part-talkie" and incorporated talking sequences, synchronized music, and sound effects, but because of Jannings's heavy German accent and the poor recording of Ralston's voice, it was released as a silent.

References

External links

Lobby card

1929 films
Silent American drama films
American silent feature films
1920s English-language films
American black-and-white films
Films directed by Lewis Milestone
Paramount Pictures films
Famous Players-Lasky films
Films set in Switzerland
Films set in the Alps
Lost American films
Transitional sound drama films
1929 drama films
1929 lost films
Lost drama films
1920s American films